Ágnes Szilágyi (born 7 March 1990 in Debrecen) is a Hungarian handballer.

Achievements
Nemzeti Bajnokság I:
Silver Medallist: 2011

References

External links
 Ágnes Szilágyi player profile on Debreceni VSC Official Website
 Ágnes Szilágyi career statistics at Worldhandball

1990 births
Living people
Sportspeople from Debrecen
Hungarian female handball players